Lydia Balatbat-Echauz is the tenth president (2002-2012) of Far Eastern University.

Education

Lydia Balatbat-Echauz holds a Bachelor of Arts degree in Economics from St. Theresa's College, a Master of Business Administration from Ateneo de Manila University, and a Doctor of Business Administration from De La Salle University.

Board memberships

As the Far Eastern University President, Echauz is also a member of the Board of Directors of FEU-East Asia College, FEU-FERN College, FERN Realty Corporation, Nicanor Reyes Sr. Memorial Foundation, Philippine Association of Colleges and Universities, Association of Women Presidents/Chancellors of Private Colleges and Universities, and Expitar.

Management experience

Echauz has served as Dean of the De La Salle Graduate School of Business; Executive Director of the Jaime V. Ongpin Institute of Business and Government from 1989 to 1994; and Corporate Affairs Consultant of SM Prime Holdings, Inc.

References

External links
Far Eastern University in the City of Manila
FEU - East Asia College
De La Salle Graduate School of Business

Filipino educators
20th-century Filipino businesspeople
Living people
Women heads of universities and colleges
Ateneo de Manila University alumni
De La Salle University alumni
Presidents of universities and colleges in the Philippines
Filipino academic administrators
Filipino women academics
Year of birth missing (living people)
21st-century Filipino businesspeople